Jules Basdevant (April 15, 1877 – March 17, 1968 in Anost) was a French law professor.

He was born in Anost, Saône-et-Loire, a village in the Parc naturel régional du Morvan about halfway between Paris and Lyon in eastern France.

After obtaining his Ph.D. in law, he began teaching at the law faculty in Paris, in February 1903, as an agrégé. He was later transferred to the law faculty of Rennes where he lectured from 1903 to 1907. He then went to Grenoble, where he was a professor until 1918, when he went back to Paris. Basdevant was promoted several times; in 1922 as professor of international law and historical treaties, in 1924 as professor of people's law and also became a technical expert for the French delegation at the Peace preliminary conference of 1919.

He worked for the Foreign Affairs Department from 1930 to 1941 as a law consultant. He was elected a member of the Academy of Political and Moral Sciences in 1944. In 1946 took up an inaugural seat on the International Court of Justice, a position he held until 1964. He served as the Court's first Vice President, from 1946 to 1949 and as President from 1949 to 1952.

Jules Basdevant is the father of Suzanne Bastid.

References
 
 Académie de Droit International de La Haye. (1968) Recueil Des Cours, Collected Courses 1936, Martinus Nijhoff Publishers. p. 473. .

1877 births
1968 deaths
People from Saône-et-Loire
International law scholars
French legal scholars
Presidents of the International Court of Justice
20th-century French judges
Members of the Académie des sciences morales et politiques
French judges of United Nations courts and tribunals